Siegfried Böhm (20 August 1928–4 May 1980) was an East German politician and long-term finance minister of East Germany. He was in office for nearly fourteen years between 1966 and 1980.

Biography
Böhm was born in Plauen on 20 August 1928. In 1966 he was appointed the finance minister and his term lasted until 1980. He was among the central committee members of the Socialist Unity Party of Germany. He was also a member of the Working Group Balance of Payments from 1974 to 1980. Böhm was one of the first officials who alerted the East German authorities about the negative consequences of the indebtedness to the Western countries. He also criticized the illegal currency and gold transactions carried out in the country.

Böhm died at his home in Berlin-Karlshorst on 4 May 1980. The East German officials reported on the next day that his wife shot him during a quarrel and then she committed suicide. In 2003 it was revealed as a result of the investigations that Böhm was in fact killed by an East German hit squad due to his potential reports about the bankruptcy faced in East Germany. His wife was also murdered by the squad to fabricate the official story of his death.

Böhm was succeeded by Werner Schmieder as finance minister in June 1980.

References

External links

1928 births
1980 deaths
Assassinated German politicians
Finance ministers of East Germany
Members of the Central Committee of the Socialist Unity Party of Germany
Members of the Volkskammer
People from Plauen
People of the Cold War
Recipients of the Patriotic Order of Merit in gold